Pegcetacoplan, sold under the brand name Empaveli,  among others, is a medication used to treat paroxysmal nocturnal hemoglobinuria and geographic atrophy of the retina. Pegcetacoplan is a complement inhibitor.

The most common side effects include injection-site reactions, infections, diarrhea, abdominal pain, respiratory tract infection, viral infection, and fatigue.

Paroxysmal nocturnal hemoglobinuria is characterized by red blood cell destruction, anemia (red blood cells unable to carry enough oxygen to tissues), blood clots, and impaired bone marrow function (not making enough blood cells).

Pegcetacoplan is the first treatment for paroxysmal nocturnal hemoglobinuria that binds to and inhibits complement protein C3. Pegcetacoplan was approved for medical use in the United States in May 2021. The US Food and Drug Administration (FDA) considers it to be a first-in-class medication.

Medical uses 
Pegcetacoplan is indicated to treat adults with paroxysmal nocturnal hemoglobinuria.

In February 2023, the indication was updated to include the treatment of people with geographic atrophy secondary to age-related macular degeneration.

Pharmacology 
People with paroxysmal nocturnal hemoglobinuria have greater and uninhibited complement activity, which may leads to intravascular (inside blood vessels) or extravascular (within the liver or spleen) hemolysis.

Adverse effects 
Meningococcal (a type of bacteria) infections can occur in people taking pegcetacoplan. Pegcetacoplan may also predispose individuals to serious infections, especially infections caused by encapsulated bacteria. These infections include but are not limited to Streptococcus pneumoniae, Neisseria meningitidis, and Haemophilus influenzae. Common adverse effects associated with the medication include stomach pain, vomiting, diarrhea, cold sores, common-cold like symptoms, tiredness as well as any itching, redness, or sensitivity at the injection site. Pegcetacoplan may cause fetal harm. Pegcetacoplan may also interfere with silica reagents in laboratory coagulation panels.

History 
The effectiveness of pegcetacoplan was evaluated in a study enrolling 80 participants with paroxysmal nocturnal hemoglobinuria and anemia who had been taking eculizumab, a treatment previously approved for paroxysmal nocturnal hemoglobinuria.

The FDA granted the application for pegcetacoplan orphan drug designation.

Society and culture

Legal status 
On 14 October 2021, the Committee for Medicinal Products for Human Use (CHMP) of the European Medicines Agency (EMA) adopted a positive opinion, recommending the granting of a marketing authorization for the medicinal product Aspaveli, intended for the treatment of adults with paroxysmal nocturnal hemoglobinuria. The applicant for this medicinal product is Swedish Orphan Biovitrum AB (publ). Pegcetacoplan was approved for medical use in the European Union in December 2021.

References

External links 
 
 
 
 

Complement system
Immunosuppressants
Orphan drugs